Dil Tera Diwana may refer to:

 Dil Tera Diwana (1962 film), a 1962 Hindi comedy film
 Dil Tera Diwana (1996 film), a 1996 Indian Bollywood film